Shadow V may refer to
 nickname of Ari Romero, a Mexican wrestler
 Shadow V (fishing boat), a fishing boat destroyed during the murder of Louis Mountbatten and others